The 1904 Haverford football team was an American football team that represented Haverford College as an independent during the 1904 college football season. The team compiled a 7–1 record and outscored opponents by a total of 144 to 27. Norman Thorn was the head coach.

Schedule

References

Haverford
Haverford Fords football seasons
Haverford football